French Township may refer to the following townships in the United States:

 French Township, Adams County, Indiana
 French Township, St. Louis County, Minnesota

See also 
 French Creek Township (disambiguation)
 French Lake Township, Wright County, Minnesota
 French Lick Township, Orange County, Indiana